Victor Darrell Henley (October 2, 1962 – April 6, 2020), was an American comedian. Henley appeared on HBO, CBS, NBC, Fox, BRAVO, CMT, XM radio MTV, A&E, The History Channel. He was a VH1 VJ and had his own Comedy Central half-hour special as well as performances on The Late Show and The Tonight Show.

Early life 
Henley was born on October 2, 1962, in Oxford, Alabama, and was a graduate of Auburn University. He was set to become a stockbroker before he landed a spot in comedy.

Career 
Henley was co-author of the national best-selling book Games Rednecks Play with fellow comedian Jeff Foxworthy. Henley was a close friend of Kathleen Madigan and Ron White.

He was a regular contributor and guest on the "Opie and Anthony Show With Jim Norton”,on XM radio. 

He had appeared on HBO, CBS, NBC, FOX, BRAVO, CMT, MTV, A&E, The History Channel. He was a VH-1 VJ and has his own Comedy Central half-hour special, as well as performances on The Late Show and The Tonight Show.

Death and legacy 
Henley died after suffering a pulmonary embolism April 6, 2020, aged 57.

References

External links
 
 

1962 births
2020 deaths
Comedians from Alabama
Deaths from pulmonary embolism
American male comedians
Writers from Alabama
People from Oxford, Alabama
Auburn University alumni
Place of death missing